Armin Kraaz (born 3 February 1965) is a German football manager and former player.

The former defender played for Viktoria Preußen until 1979 and then moved to Eintracht Frankfurt. From 1983 to 1984 he was fielded in the pro squad, appearing in 123 Bundesliga fixtures, netting three goals. In 1988, he went to Rot-Weiss Frankfurt. His departure from Eintracht was a painful one as after the DFB Cup victory of the Eagles he sat crying on the bench as an unused sub.

In 1996, he joined the Eintracht coaching staff and firstly managed the Under-19 team. In March 1997, he shortly played for the Eintracht reserves and carried on to manage the Under-19 team. In January 2001 he was promoted to become assistant manager of the pro team. Between 8 March and 27 May 2002 was caretaker for the Eagles.

At present he is the director of the Eintracht youth academy.

References

External links
 Armin Kraaz at eintracht-archiv.de 
 

1965 births
Living people
German footballers
German football managers
SV Viktoria Preußen 07 players
Eintracht Frankfurt players
Eintracht Frankfurt II players
Rot-Weiss Frankfurt players
Bundesliga players
Eintracht Frankfurt managers
Eintracht Frankfurt non-playing staff
Association football defenders
Footballers from Frankfurt